Szpilki was a Polish satirical magazine. The title literally means "Pins".

Motto: Prawdziwa cnota krytyk się nie boi, ("The true virtue is not afraid of criticisms")  a quote from Ignacy Krasicki's mock-heroic poem .

Suspended during World War II, it was resumed in 1945. In 1953 Szpilki was merged with another satirical magazine, Mucha.

Together with many other printed media, it was suspended during the martial law in Poland. Since 1990 the magazine met with troubles, and after several attempts of reanimation it was closed in 1994.

References

Further reading
Olaf Bergmann, "Prawdziwa cnota krytyk się nie boi..." Karykatura w czasopismach satyrycznych Drugiej Rzeczypospolitej, 2012, 

1936 establishments in Poland
1994 disestablishments in Poland
Defunct magazines published in Poland
Satirical magazines published in Europe
Magazines established in 1936
Magazines disestablished in 1994
Magazines published in Poland
Polish-language magazines
Polish humour
Polish satire